Total Strife Forever is the debut album by the electronic musician East India Youth. It was released on January 13, 2014 by Stolen Recordings. The album was nominated for the 2014 Mercury Prize.

The cover of Total Strife Forever was designed by Kohhei Matsuda (of Bo Ningen) and features a portrait of William Doyle by artist Tida Bradshaw.

The album title is a pun on the Foals album Total Life Forever.

Track listing

Chart positions

References 

East India Youth albums
2014 debut albums
Stolen Recordings albums